In 1973 the Institution of Engineers Australia (now Engineers Australia) and the Australasian Institute of Mining and Metallurgy (AusIMM) collaborated in the formation of the Australian Tunnelling Association.  It is a professional organization of engineers and other skilled professionals committed to the maintenance of high standards and the expansion of technical and scientific knowledge pertaining to tunnel construction.

In 1981 the Australian Tunnelling Association became the Australian Underground Construction and Tunnelling Association (AUCTA), operating as a technical society sponsored by Engineers Australia and AusIMM under status approved by the Councils of both organisations. In 2005 a New Zealand Chapter of the Technical Society was formed, and in order to better reflect its international membership, AUCTA changed its name to the Australasian Tunnelling Society (ATS).

The ATS is a non-profit making technical organisation with the aims of providing a forum for mutual technical development, networking, expanding and sharing knowledge, special interest identification, specialist recognition, and establishment of national links, expert opinion and influence.

References

Engineering societies based in Australia
Tunnelling organizations
Tunnels in Australia
1973 establishments in Australia
2005 establishments in New Zealand